These are the  results of the 2023 Asian Indoor Athletics Championships which took place between 10 and 12 February 2023 in Astana, Kazakhstan.

Men's results

60 meters

Heats – 11 February

Semifinals – 11 February

Final – 11 February

400 meters

Heats – 10 February

Semifinals – 10 February

Final – 11 February

800 meters

Heats – 10 February

Final – 12 February

1500 meters
11 February

3000 meters
12 February

60 meters hurdles

Heats – 11 February

Final – 12 February

4 × 400 meters relay
12 February

High jump
Qualification – 11 February

Qualifying height: 2.19 m

Final – 12 February

Pole vault
12 February

Long jump
Qualification – 10 February

Qualifying mark: 7.95 m

Final – 12 February

Triple jump
10 February

Shot put
10 February

Heptathlon
11–12 February

Women's results

60 meters

Heats – 10 February

Final – 10 February

400 meters

Heats – 10 February

Final – 11 February

800 meters
12 February

1500 meters
11 February

3000 meters
10 February

60 meters hurdles

Heats – 11 February

Final – 12 February

4 × 400 meters relay
12 February

High jump
12 February

Pole vault
11 February

Long jump
12 February

Triple jump
11 February

Shot put
11 February

Pentathlon
10 February

References

Asian Indoor Championships Results
Events at the Asian Indoor Athletics Championships